Gennadiy Bilodid (born 22 July 1977) was a Ukrainian judoka.

He is the father of judoka Daria Bilodid.

Achievements

References

External links
 

1977 births
Living people
Ukrainian male judoka
Judoka at the 2000 Summer Olympics
Judoka at the 2004 Summer Olympics
Judoka at the 2008 Summer Olympics
Olympic judoka of Ukraine